Sanjagan (also Romanized as Sanjagān, Sanjegān, Sanjgān, Senjegān, Senjgān, and Sīnjgān) is a village in Rahjerd-e Sharqi Rural District, Salafchegan District, Qom County, Qom Province, Iran. At the 2006 census, its population was 336, in 119 families.

This village is known for its dam and historical area.

Photos

References 

Populated places in Qom Province